Angela Dimitriou (born Athens, Greece, August 18, 1954) is a Greek singer.

She is also famous in the Arab countries across the Middle East, with her song "Margarites" hitting the top of the charts in Lebanon, among other places. She made a song with Egyptian singer Amr Diab called "Ana Bahebak Aktar." Both songs were produced by Minos-Emi Greece A&R manager Vangelis Yannopoulos through his connections with EMI Arabia. She also covered Marc Almond's song "Death's Diary", in Greek titled "Astrapes kai Vrontes" (Lightnings and Thunders). She is often criticized because of her low education and her comic manner of verbal expression. Angela Dimitriou's biggest hit and signature song is "Fotia Sta Savvatovrada" ("Fire on Saturday Nights") produced by Sony Music A&R manager Yannis Doulamis. Her CD single Ah Patrida Mou went gold. On 14 March 2010, Alpha TV ranked Dimitriou the ninth top-certified female artist in the nation's phonographic era (since 1960).

Discography
1979: Antzela Dimitriou 
1980: Gia Ti Na 'rtheis Arga gold 
1983: Oti Poume Metaxi Mas
1983: Mia Vradia Sta Bouzoukia No. 1
1984: Mia Vradia Sta Bouzoukia No. 2
1984: Peste Tou
1985: Poia Thisia - Gold platinum 
1986: Dio Fones - Gold
1987: Kanonise To
1987: Mia Vradia Stin Fantasia No. 1 - Gold
1988: Mia Vradia Stin Fantasia No. 2
1988: Mia S'agapo Mia Se Miso gold 
1989: Na Sou Orkisto - Gold
1990: Esi Ti Les - Platinum
1991: Exerountai - Platinum
1992: Fotia Sta Savvatovrada: 1982–1992 Deka Hronia Tragoudi - Double Platinum
1992: Kokkino Tis Fotias - Gold platinum 
1993: Ftaiei O Erotas (CD single)
1993: Ftaiei O Erotas - Platinum
1994: Pes Afto Pou Theleis (first co operation with Foivos) - Gold platinum 
1995: Gynaika Ego - Gold platinum 
1996: Ektos Eleghou I Amartia
1996: Mi Mas Agapas - gold Platinum 
1997: Ta Zeibekika Tis Antzelas 
1998: 100% - Gold platinum
1999: Margarites (CD single)
1999: Kane Stin Akri - Gold platinum 
2000: Mavri Lista - Gold platinum 
2001: Hilia Prosopa
2002: Ti Na Ta Kano Afta Pou Eho (CD single) 
2002: Opou Me Paei I Kardia gold 
2004: Kyria Me Gnorises, Kyria Tha Meino...Live gold 
2004: Gia Sena (CD single)
2004: The Best Of Antzela Dimitriou
2004: Pios Eisai
2005: S'eho?
2006: Oxygono + Live
2007: Ah! Patrida Mou - Gold
2007: Ta' Da Ola gold
2008: Ftaine Oi Antres
2010: Gyalina Ftera gold 
2011: Meine Ekei - Gold
2013: Come Back - gold Platinum
2015: Standard gold platinum

Singles
2014: Apo 'do Kai Pera (cd single)
2016: Oti Mou Anikei (cd single)
2016: Anexartiti (cd single)
2017: An Nyhtosei (cd single)
2018: An Eiha Enan Anthropo (cd single)
2018: De M' Aggizei I Krisi (cd single)
2019: Patera Na 'Souna Edo (cd single)
2019: Kita Me (cd single)
2020: Vale Rdio (cd single)
2020: Tha Synehiso (cd single)
2020: Vges (Single)

References

External links

20th-century Greek women singers
Singers from Athens
Living people
Greek laïko singers
1954 births
Minos EMI artists
21st-century Greek women singers